Riverlake is a plantation and an antebellum mansion, located on the west bank of the False River in Pointe Coupee Parish, Louisiana, about  south of New Roads, Louisiana.

The house is a raised Creole-style plantation house built and modified in c.1820, c.1840-45, and c.1890.  The listing included two pigeonniers, believed to date from c.1820.

It was listed on the National Register of Historic Places in 1983.

The plantation is the birthplace of author Ernest Gaines, who played in its slave quarters area while a child.

Two slave cabins survive, out of 30 or more, and are listed on the National Register as Cherie Quarters Cabins.

It is currently owned by the Calliet family.

References

Creole architecture in Louisiana
Houses on the National Register of Historic Places in Louisiana
Houses completed in 1820
Houses in Pointe Coupee Parish, Louisiana
Plantation houses in Louisiana
National Register of Historic Places in Pointe Coupee Parish, Louisiana
Slave cabins and quarters in the United States